Dendroctonus is a genus of bark beetles. It includes several species notorious for destroying trees in the forests of North America. The genus has a symbiotic relationship with many different yeasts, particularly those in the genera Candida and Pichia that aid in digestion and pheromone production.

Species include:
Dendroctonus adjunctus - roundheaded pine beetle
Dendroctonus approximatus - Mexican pine beetle
Dendroctonus barberi - southwestern pine beetle
Dendroctonus brevicomis - western pine beetle
Dendroctonus frontalis - southern pine beetle
Dendroctonus jeffreyi - Jeffrey pine beetle
Dendroctonus mesoamericanus - Mesoamerican pine beetle
Dendroctonus mexicanus - smaller Mexican pine beetle
Dendroctonus micans - great spruce bark beetle
Dendroctonus murrayanae - lodgepole pine beetle
Dendroctonus parallelocollis - larger Mexican pine beetle
Dendroctonus ponderosae - mountain pine beetle
Dendroctonus pseudotsugae - Douglas-fir beetle
Dendroctonus punctatus - Allegheny spruce beetle
Dendroctonus rufipennis - spruce beetle
Dendroctonus simplex - eastern larch beetle
Dendroctonus terebrans - black turpentine beetle
Dendroctonus valens - red turpentine beetle
Dendroctonus vitei

References

External links 

Dendroctonus Species of the Western United States

Scolytinae
Curculionidae genera